Mark Richard Durden-Smith (born 8 February 1944), known as Richard Durden, is an English actor, with a range of television, film and stage credits.

Personal life
Durden-Smith was educated at Haileybury and Imperial Service College and Merton College, Oxford in 1963.

Durden-Smith and Maria Aitken were married in 1968 and divorced in 1971. In 1996 he married actress Jane How. 
His older brother was Jo Durden-Smith.

Filmography

Film

Television

On radio, he played Bashwood in Armadale.

References

External links
 

1944 births
Living people
Aitken family
Alumni of Merton College, Oxford
English male soap opera actors
People educated at Haileybury and Imperial Service College